Aigeis was a tribe (phyle) of Ancient Athens which contained twenty demes.

The phyle comprised twenty demes named Lower and Upper Ankyle, Araphen, Bate, Diomeia, Erchia, Erikeia, Gargettos, Halai, Hestiaia, Ikarion, Ionidai, Kollytos, Kolonos, Kydantidai, Myrrhinoutta, Otryne, Phegaia, Philaidai, Plotheia.

The quota of demes for Aigeis showed the greatest variety of all the phyles during the first and second periods (343–253 BC) of bouleutic government.

Of the deme Ankylē, an individual is known, Polystratos, who owned land within that deme.

An individual named Hagnias II had an estate within the deme Araphen.

At the time of the publication of a source published during 1851, the location of Bate was unknown.

Erchia, Ikarion, Phegaia  were some of the larger demes of the tribe.

References

Tribes of ancient Attica